

SNCF stations by region
The following link to SNCF stations, grouped by region (SNCF managed RER stations with no other SNCF service are not included on the Île-de-France page – see List of stations of the Paris RER for a full listing of RER stations):
 List of SNCF stations in Auvergne-Rhône-Alpes
 List of SNCF stations in Bourgogne-Franche-Comté
 List of SNCF stations in Brittany
 List of SNCF stations in Centre-Val de Loire
 List of SNCF stations in Grand Est
 List of SNCF stations in Hauts-de-France
 List of SNCF stations in Île-de-France
 List of SNCF stations in Normandy
 List of SNCF stations in Nouvelle-Aquitaine
 List of SNCF stations in Occitanie
 List of SNCF stations in Pays de la Loire
 List of SNCF stations in Provence-Alpes-Côte d'Azur

Former SNCF stations
The following link to articles on SNCF stations no longer in service
 Bordeaux État
 Rouen Rive-Gauche
 Rouen Nord
 Rouen Orléans
 Honfleur
 Paris Orsay (now the Musée d'Orsay)

See also
 List of TGV stations

External links
 SNCF website
 map of the TGV network
 Collection of Google Earth locations of SNCF stations (Requires Google Earth software) from the Google Earth Community forum

stations